is a fictional character from the Ultra Series of tokusatsu and the name of a 1996 movie in the series.

Premise
Ultraman Zearth is a parody of Ultraman. He hails from the Land of Pikari in Nebula Z95. He has a big red face and dislikes dirt, and will go to great lengths to wash it off his hands. His goal is to clean the polluted Earth. He transforms with an electric toothbrush, which is consistent with his hygiene fixation. He's not quite adept at being a superhero, but at least he tries his best.

His human form is Katsuto Asahi who also dislikes dirt like Zearth.

Appearances
Zearth's first movie, Ultraman Zearth, was released in 1996 to celebrate the 30th anniversary of the original Ultraman, as part of the Ultraman Wonderful World (along with Revive! Ultraman and Ultraman Company). Ultraman Zearth 2 is paired with the first Ultra Nyan short.

Cameos by other characters
The movies include cameos by most of the original Science Patrol from Ultraman. Arashi is a helicopter reporter (which is not too far from what he currently does in real life). In Ultraman Zearth, Hayata is a night watchman (who holds his flashlight up like a Beta Capsule) and in Ultraman Zearth 2 he is a common citizen who tries to transform into Ultraman with a spoon (echoing Hayata's performance from episode 34), Fuji (the only woman who ever catches the Mydo plane taking off from a secret base exit, which happens to be a billboard), Ide (as a photographer), and Captain Muramatsu, as a fisherman. In Ultraman Zearth 2, Ide shows up as the fisherman's son with a photograph of his dad (actor Akiji Kobayashi, who played Captain Muramatsu, died between films). And finally, in Ultraman Zearth 2, we are treated to a rare cameo reappearance of Jiro Dan, none other than Hideki Go from The Return of Ultraman as a telecast reporter on TV.

The second movie features "Digital Kanegon", which is a take on the original Kanegon from Ultra Q. It also features Kohji Moritsugu (Dan Moroboshi from Ultra Seven) as Captain Ban Satsuma. The running joke is that he frequently lets slip that he knows that we in the audience know that he's Mr. Moritsugu/Dan Moroboshi/Ultraseven. He says "Natsukashii! (how nostalgic!)" when he sees Capsule Monster Miraclon. At the end of the movie, he also nudges Katsuto and tells him he'll have to teach him the heel drop sometime, which implies that Dan knows that Katsuto is really Zearth.

Characters

Ultraman Zearth

Stats
Height: 60 meter
Weight: 54,540 tons
Flight Speed: Mach 19.9
Running Speed: Mach 5.55
Swimming Speed: 889 kilometer per hour
Tunneling Speed: Mach 1
Jumping Distance: 1000 meter
Human Form: Katsuto Asahi
Transformation Item:  in Ultraman Zearth /  in Ultraman Zearth 2.

Weapons
  Zearth's "+" style finishing move. Can destroy monsters in one shot. This move has been quoted by Mydo's AI, Midori, and Alien Benzen, as a dangerous attack that could destroy Earth in one shot if it hits a particularly powerful source of energy, such as Cotten-Poppe.
  Zearth's "x" style finishing move. Can destroy monsters in one shot.
  Teleports objects/people using beams of light from his eyes. 
  A kick combo.
  A spinning kick with enough force to send an enemy flying into space.
  An axe kick.
  A kick combo.
  An electric knee kick.
  A drop kick from high above.
  A drop kick from high above at maximum flight speed.
  A hand chop.
  A chop from high above.
  An energy chop.
  A punch combo.
  A powerful and aimed punch.
  Sterilizes the area within a 50 km radius. Not used in movies.
  Rewinds time. Not used in movies.
  Slows time. Not used in movies.
  Makes hyperspace temporarily. Not used in movies.
  A horizontal chop. Not used in movies.
 Z Capsule Light Monster Miraclon  A gift to Zearth from his father.

Monsters, Aliens and Capsule Monsters

Alien Benzen
, in Ultraman Zearth and Ultraman Zearth 2, appeared in Earth to steal gold, the specific medicine of his chronic illness. He assumes a human form named . He has the vehicle named  that transforms into a helicopter and a car.

Cotten-Poppe
, in Ultraman Zearth, is a monster used by Alien Benzen to steal gold all over Japan. Cotten-Poppe absorbed gold for the purpose of using it as medicine for its master, but this had the side effect of it absorbing massive quantities of energy which meant that it could explode if hit by Zearth's Speciu-Shula Ray. Ultimately, it was paralysed by Zearth, then flown into space and detonated.

Ultraman Shadow
, in Ultraman Zearth 2, is an anti-Ultraman Zearth robot made by Alien Lady-Benzen. Unlike Zearth, it was black and yellow instead of Zearth's original colour. It had evil red eyes, pointed ears and head fin. It used full power to fight Zearth, but destroyed in battle by Zearth.

Stats
Height: 62 meter
Weight: 65,000 tons
Flight Speed: Mach 21
Running Speed: Mach 6
Swimming Speed: Mach 1
Jumping Distance: 1200 meter

Weapons
  Shadow's "L" style finishing move. Rival's Zearth's in power.
  Can fire a beam of red energy from its eyes, turning humans into mindless followers of its creator, Lady Benzen.
  Brass knuckles.
  Multiple punches with the Shadow Merikens.
  Small missiles from the Shadow Merikens.
  Shadow has a Color Timer, like Zearth, but it is equipped with a shield to protect it against attack.
  A spinning kick.
  Shadow's monster capsule.

Alien Lady-Benzen
, in Ultraman Zearth 2, is Alien Benzen's wife and controls Ultraman Shadow. She assumes a human form named . She congratulates Zearth and she says she will return to Earth to steal mankind's souls.

Miraclon
, in Ultraman Zearth 2, is Zearth's Capsule Monster.

Darklar
, in Ultraman Zearth 2, is Alien Lady-Benzen's Capsule Monster. To create the monster, Alien Lady-Benzen converted a lifeform named  that inhabits , a moon of Planet Benzen.

Digital Kanegon
, in Ultraman Zearth 2, is a monster originated from Ultra Q, and is Mydo's mascot. He is a robotic version of Kanegon, and contained a computer which helped the team in their studies of the Benzen aliens.

MYDO
A space-based defense organization formed around the Earth Defense Federation with the Mystery Case that seems to be an alien from the end of the 20th century. The organization name "MYDO" stands for Mysterious Yonder Defence Organization. It is an international defense force of the lower organizations, from the Asian headquarters, North America and South America, Europe, Africa, South Pacific, Silicon Valley, the Migo desert and Japan, to outer space; Delambre (Moon), Ellara, Sinope (both Jupiter), Titan (Saturn), Ariel (Uranus) also place the base. A large-scale organizational reformation was done between the first and second work. The Japanese branch camouflaged the Idemitsu Kosan gas station in the center of Tokyo, and the captains, deputy-captains, troops also work as managers, vice managers and shop clerks, hiding their identity. Naming is from Idemitsu's "MYDO Card".

 is the captain in Ultraman Zearth. He was promoted to a staff officer in Ultraman Zearth 2.
 is the deputy captain in Ultraman Zearth. He was promoted to a deputy staff officer in Ultraman Zearth 2.
 is the captain in Ultraman Zearth 2.
 is the deputy captain in Ultraman Zearth 2.
 is a female member. She has a younger brother named .
 is a powerful man. He is a strong owner who can stop the carnage's car and is good at shooting and inventing. 29 years old.
 is Ultraman Zearth's human form.
 is an AI. A bell-shaped supercomputer that manages the Mydo underground base. The monitor is green as the name is. Only a Mydo captain whose voice print and palm print are registered can access it. Although it is an inorganic personality, there are also tea ceremonies such as apologizing for failure to make an analysis mistake. In the 2nd film, a female-faced polygon appeared, and the human smelled.

MYDO Mecha
Their mecha used to defend earth against the monsters and also support Ultraman Zearth.
MYDO Headquarters: From the idea that the existence of outright military organizations buy antipathy of citizens in this era in which international disputes on the earth virtually disappeared, the ground part camouflaged on gas stations and the majority of base functions were established. It consists of a tower-like underground part with a height of 100 m or more. Although it was the Asian headquarters in the first film, due to an organizational reformation, it became the Japanese branch in the second work, and the headquarters base function moved to a certain place in Asia. As stated earlier, since members are usually working as gas clerk staff, on the ground part there is a skyfish launch port camouflaged in the office and cumberish main office rooms and advertisement signs as well as the facilities as a stand in the basement part, there is a room with a bell-shaped supercomputer MIDORI that manages the entire base and collects and analyzes information, including a room with skyfish storage and members, a maintenance room, a weapons laboratory, a chemical room, Data room, medical room, game hall, large public bath and training room. In the 2nd work, a locker with a special function was installed in the operational room, which caused the men's clothes to be worn instantly and teleported to the cockpit of the ride by entering the 2nd, the underground hangar was also expanded, and the starting point of the Sky Shark was newly established. When leaving the Sky Shark, the entire base will rise to the ground. Although it have been disturbed by neighbors several times, they managed to get through.
: The main fighter of Mydo. Started off from the gas station signboard. Although it is a multi-wing aircraft designed with yellow and light blue, due to the flashy color scheme, the first one was described as a "bad taste" in the reporter. In the 2nd film, Unit 2 of the same shape and different painting (red and silver color) appeared. From the 2nd work, they came to the cockpit by teleporting from the above locker. The main equipment is a Mydo laser cannon. Also equipped with firearms such as missiles. In the second work, they mounted a light wire for locking an enemy monster called a laser rope on the nose.
: Mydo's battle mother ship which appeared in the second work. Boasting advanced flight technology and fighting power, it can also work underwater, in space, in the ground, as well as ordinary aviation. It uses jet engines in the atmosphere and rocket engines in outer space. Although having a high fighting ability such as loading dozens of the latest weapons, in the play, only the Zetton light cannon which reproduced the ray used when Zetton beat the first Ultraman was used. Besides, it has a strategy conference room, a sleeping room, a game center, etc.. The Zetton beam gun is a very powerful weapon that reproduces Zetton's rays (wavy rays that destroyed the color timer) by intersecting a current of 60 million amperes and electromagnetism of 25 million gauss. In defeating Ultraman Shadow, the original Ultraman was created to destroy the timer in the same way based on the fact that the color timer was destroyed by Zetton. If it was a clean hit it was a big deal, but it was rebounded without difficulty to the shadow who had anticipated attacks on color timers and crashed in reverse. Then it was destroyed with Shadow's Meriken missile.
Mydo suit: Red and silver men's clothing worn at the time of exit, manufactured by the MYDO Super Science Team. It is super lightweight, excellent at heat and cold resistance, waterproofing and windbreak performance, and has high defense power. Dedicated boots have seven tools for every task. When working at the base, they wear the uniform at the gas station staff.
Mydo Met: It is a special helmet custom made to wear at the exit, absorbing impact by 100% and not receiving bullet/flame damage.
: A small super gun carried by all the members. Normally you can fire a laser beam and you can shoot several kinds of laser beams, heat rays, anesthetic bullets, 45 caliber simulated bullets etc. by button operation.
: Ultra high performance large beam gun similar to a shotgun, exclusively for Iwata. Cock your foregrip and charge energy. Blue destructive light bullets, yellow destructive lights, anesthetic lights can be shot and divided by button operation, and flame radiation is also possible. Because there is weight it cannot handle things other than Takemura. Assembly decomposition type, can be transported by attachment case.

Cast
Shinpei Ohkohchi: 
Butsukichi Konakai: 
Katsuto Asahi: 
Tohru Hoshimi: 
Ganta Takemura: 
Akuma Ogami/Alien Benzen (Voice): 
Night Watchman: 
Photographer: 
Reporter: 
Housewife: 

Ultraman Zearth exclusively
: 
: 
: 
: 
Fisherman: 
Midori (Voice): 
Narration: 

Ultraman Zearth 2 exclusively
Ban Satsuma: 
Manabu Kazu: 
Kagemi/Alien Lady-Benzen (Voice): 
Master of Seidokaikan: 
Instructor of Seidokaikan: 
Assistant Instructor: 
Yuki Hoshimi:  (Played as "崎元 大海")
: 
: 
: 
Telecast Reporter: 
Onlookers: , 
Midori (Voice): 
Digital Kanegon (Voice):

Theme song

Lyrics: 
Composition: 
Artist:

Games
A game adaption of Ultraman Zearth was available for PlayStation.

References

Films directed by Kazuya Konaka
Ultra Series films
1996 films
1997 films
1990s Japanese films